The East Zone Cultural Centre has its headquarters in Sector III, IB 201, IB Block, Salt Lake City, Kolkata, which is also known as the Cultural Capital of India and most commonly City of Joy is situated in the Indian state of West Bengal.It is one of the seven Zones established in India.The Indian states which are under the Eastern Cultural Zone are West Bengal, Jharkhand, Bihar, Odisha, Assam, Tripura, Manipur, Sikkim, Andaman & Nicobar Islands. This zone is home to three classical dance Odissi, Sattriya and Manipuri dance. Classical music Odissi music and semi-classical music Rabindra Sangeet. Odia is one of Classical language in India and only living classical language from Eastern India.

History 
The EZCC has been functioning from 1985 and playing a significant role promote the numerous ethnic cultural centres and groups of excellence of the eastern parts of the India. And the objective of EZCC is projection and dissemination of eastern part of India's traditional culture.

Composition 
The members of the EZCC are 1. Cultural Affairs Deptt. Govt. of Assam, 2. Director, Arts, Culture & Youth Affairs Deptt. Government of Bihar, 3. Director, Department of Art, Culture, Sports and Youth Affairs, Govt. of Jharkhand, 4. Commissioner (Art & Culture), Govt. Manipur, 5. Director Culture, Govt. of Odisha, 6. OSD, Cultural Affairs & Heritage Deptt. Govt. Sikkim, 6. Secretary & Director, ICAT, Govt. of Tripura, 7. Joint Secretary & Ex-Officio, Director of Culture, Govt. West Bengal and Director and 8. Department of Art and Culture, ANDAMAN & NICOBAR ISLANDS Administration.

Schemes 
There are various schemes sponsored by The Ministry of Culture, Government of India gives grants to the Zonal Cultural Centers. These schemes are National Cultural Exchange Programme, Theatre rejuvenation scheme, North East Programme, Guru Shishya Parampara and young talent search.
To promote the culture in youth there are many competition organise by EZCC in following fields :
  Folk Music
  Folk Dance
  Classical Music
  Classical Dance

To preserve this Indian tradition, the EZCC organises various Guru Shishya Parampara schemes, which include:
	Gotipua Dance (Odisha)
	Purulia Chhau Dance (West Bengal)
	Paika / Paika akhada a War Dancs from (Odisha)
	Nauta (West Bengal)
	Bordoishilka (Assam)
	Thang-Ta Dance (Manipur)
	Bhatiali Folk Songs (West Bengal)
	Kushan Dance (Assam)
	Pung cholom (Manipur)
	Maruni (Sikkim)

West Bengal's capital Kolkata is the largest city of this region. The states of Odisha and West Bengal share a lot cultural and linguistic characteristics with Bangladesh and with the state of Assam. Together with Bangladesh, West Bengal forms the ethno-linguistic region of Bengal, which was also a unified administrative region until 1947.

Odissi dance is the oldest survive classical dance, Pattachitra the most influential ancient classical painting, classical Odishian unique ancient architecture Kalinga architecture like Konark, Lingraja, lalitgiri etc.  Odia is the only modern Indo-Aryan language accorded the status of a Classical Language in India, and Odissi music is claimed to be the classical Music among Karnatik and Hindustani Music.

Other Regional Cultural Centres of India
 North Zone Cultural Centre, Patiala, Punjab
 West Zone Cultural Centre Udaipur, Rajasthan
 North East Zone Cultural Centre, Chümoukedima, Nagaland
 South Zone Cultural Centre

The Cultural Zones of India are seven overlapping zones defined by the Ministry of Culture of the Government of India to promote and preserve the cultural heritage of various regions of India.

References 

Culture of Kolkata
 
1986 establishments in West Bengal
Cultural centres in India
Cultural organisations based in India
Arts organizations established in 1986